USS Bougainville (LHA-8) is an   currently under construction for the United States Navy. She will be the second Navy ship to be named Bougainville.

Design

Bougainville will be the first Flight I America-class ship, and as such will include a well deck. The design of the Flight I America-class ships, including that of Bougainville, adopts a compromise, incorporating a slightly smaller aircraft hangar as well as smaller medical and other spaces to fit a small well deck for surface connector operations. The island structure will also be modified to free up more room on the flight deck to accommodate maintenance of V-22s, compensating for some of the lost aircraft hangar space.

Bougainville will be the first of her class built with a redesigned and stronger main deck; the earlier America-class vessels America and Tripoli each required retrofitting in order to handle the strain of daily F-35B Lightning II flight operations. In addition, Bougainville will incorporate the AN/SPY-6 Enterprise Air Surveillance Radar (EASR) volume air search radar in lieu of the AN/SPS-48G air search radar in America and Tripoli.

Construction and career 
Bougainville is being built by Huntington Ingalls Industries at their shipyard in Pascagoula, Mississippi and is expected to be delivered to the U.S. Navy in 2024.

Bougainville officially started fabrication on 16 October 2018. The ship was first laid down on 14 March 2019.

References

External links
Huntington Ingalls Shipbuilding: America-class of Amphibious Assault Ships

 

America-class amphibious assault ships